Fartan-e Tazeh (also Romanized as Farţān-e Tāzeh; also known as Fartan) is a village in Azari Rural District, in the Central District of Esfarayen County, North Khorasan Province, Iran. At the 2006 census, its population was 1,135, in 263 families.

References 

Populated places in Esfarayen County